František Zyka (born 3 March 1902, date of death unknown) was a Czech long-distance runner. He competed in the marathon at the 1928 Summer Olympics.

References

1902 births
Year of death missing
Athletes (track and field) at the 1928 Summer Olympics
Czech male long-distance runners
Czech male marathon runners
Olympic athletes of Czechoslovakia
Athletes from Prague